Admiral Graves  may refer to:
Samuel Graves (1713–1787), fleet commander in America from 1774
Thomas Graves, 1st Baron Graves (1725–1802), fleet commander in America from 1781, and in command during the Napoleonic Wars
 Thomas Graves (Royal Navy officer) (c. 1747–1814), admiral after service in the Seven Years' War